Alberto Mario (Lendinara, 4 June 1825 – 2 June 1883) was an Italian politician, journalist and supporter of Giuseppe Garibaldi. His wife was Jessie White, an English supporter of Garibaldi.

References 

1825 births
1883 deaths
People of the Italian unification